Margaret Ruth Draper (November 20, 1916 – October 14, 2011) was an American actress and international service worker.

Early years
Draper was born in 1916, the third of six children born to Delbert Morley Draper and Frances Mary Rogers. Shortly after her birth her family relocated to Salt Lake City where she lived until 1934.

She performed in her first play when she was four, when the University of Utah drama department came to Stewart School to find two children – Draper and her brother Courtney - to appear in The Hour Glass. Draper attended East High School in Salt Lake City, where she participated in dramatic, dancing and musical productions. Due to shortened school years and the Great Depression, She entered the University of Utah at age 15.  However, due to poor grades, she was sent by her parents to business college for a year, where she learned skills that helped her earn a living when she arrived in New York. She was readmitted to the university the following year, and majored in dramatics, graduating with a respectable average.  A 1940 newspaper article noted that she "is pleasantly remembered for her performances in Theta Alpha Phi productions" at the university.

The summer she graduated from university, she accompanied a friend and his sister to New York City to pursue a career in the theatre. She went with a single bag and $38.50 in her purse. Alone in New York, she found a small room in Tudor City and soon began working in G. Schirmer's music store.

Career
Draper landed her first job with the Provincetown Theater in return for translating a French play.

In the late 1930s through 1940, Draper was active in the theater in the Eastern United States for four seasons. She worked with the Wharf School of the Theater, Provincetown, Massachusetts; Green Lake Players, Buffalo, New York; Cherry Lane Theatre, New York City, New York; and Chekhov Theater Studio, Ridgefield, Connecticut.

During World War II, she worked for two years for the Red Cross in Europe and the Middle East as a recreational director, and returned to lean years in New York until 1947, when she got her first radio role with Carl Beier in the CBS program, Joe Powers of Oakville. (Another source says: "In 1947, she joined with the Barter Theatre and for a year toured with that company throughout the southwest. In March of 1948, she returned to New York and radio ....")

She later appeared in the Actor's Equity presentation of "Peer Gynt", and was voted one of the most promising actresses of the year. She obtained supporting roles in two Broadway shows, played the part of Fay Perkins in the radio soap opera Ma Perkins, and in 1949 was invited to audition for the part of Liz Dennis in Brighter Day. She won the part, and played Liz until around 1954, when the part of Linda Pepper was being cast for Pepper Young's Family, which she won. ^ 

Draper appeared in The Gambler in New York City in 1952. Her Broadway credits included A Minor Adjustment, during the 1967-1968 season.

Family life
Draper married actor Joe De Santis in May 1949, and became the mother of her only child, Christopher, in 1951. The marriage ended in 1957. In 1959, she married Nicol Bissel, an architect. She moved to Mamaroneck, New York, and for a year and a half was a housewife and mother. She divorced again, in 1960, and returned to Manhattan, where she worked in various theatrical productions whenever possible, but made her living, in large part, doing TV and radio commercials. In addition to hundreds of individual spots for various products, she acted as the spokesperson for Camel cigarettes, Nescafe, Kraft Foods products, Woolite detergent and others. 

In 1966, she became a disc jockey for an all-woman FM radio station in New York, WFEM (otherwise known as WNEW-FM) and in 1969, she joined the United Seamen's Service, an organization that provided rest and service clubs for merchant marine sailors around the world. Her first assignment was as the assistant Director of the club in Cam Ranh Bay, Viet Nam. In 1970, the Viet Nam club was closed because of the war, and she was transferred to the club in Naples, Italy as director, where she served until 1972. 

In 1972, she married J. Norman Messer (CDR USN) who was serving as Executive Officer on the USS Cascade, stationed in Naples. They moved to Key West, Florida, but Margaret was once again divorced in 1973. Subsequently, she lived in Geneva, Switzerland; in Alexandria, Egypt, where she established a club for the United Seamen's Service; and in Washington, D.C., where she worked for the National Alliance of Business as a reference specialist in the PSIP Clearinghouse.

Later years & death
Draper retired in 1985, in New York City, and began writing an autobiographical novel. She resided for a time in Santa Fe, New Mexico but found that she missed the culture, theater, and activity or New York, as well as her many friends, and returned there. In later life she was married to Wesley Brown and traveled extensively with him until his death after four years. 

In 2003, Draper moved to an independent living community in Salt Lake City. In the fall of 2010, she moved to her son's home in Payson, Utah, and the following spring she settled in a care facility in that same town, where she died on October 14, 2011, aged 94.

References

External links
 

1916 births
2011 deaths
Actresses from Utah
American radio actresses
American stage actresses
People from Spanish Fork, Utah
University of Utah alumni
21st-century American women